Madelein Lotter (born 22 November 1971) is a South African former cricketer who played as a right-handed batter. She appeared in one Test match and one One Day International for South Africa between in 2002, both against India. She played domestic cricket for Boland.

References

External links
 
 

1971 births
Living people
People from Somerset West
South African women cricketers
South Africa women Test cricketers
South Africa women One Day International cricketers
Boland women cricketers
Cricketers from the Western Cape